is a former Japanese badminton player. Born in Saitama Prefecture, Ida graduated from Saitama High School. She was part of the national women's team that competed at the 1994 and 1998 Asian Games, winning the bronze medals in both events, and also participated at the 1994, 1996 and 1998 Uber Cups. She won the women's singles title at the National Championships tournament in 1996 and 1997. Ida also competed at the 1997 East Asian Games in Busan, South Korea, clinched the women's singles silver and the women's team bronze medals. Ida who was affiliated with Sanyo Electric, took part at the Sydney 2000 Olympics in the women's singles event.

Achievements

East Asian Games 
Women's singles

IBF World Grand Prix
The World Badminton Grand Prix sanctioned by International Badminton Federation (IBF) since 1983.

Women's singles

IBF International
Women's singles

References

External links
 
 

1972 births
Living people
Sportspeople from Saitama Prefecture
Japanese female badminton players
Olympic badminton players of Japan
Badminton players at the 2000 Summer Olympics
Badminton players at the 1998 Asian Games
Badminton players at the 1994 Asian Games
Asian Games bronze medalists for Japan
Asian Games medalists in badminton
Medalists at the 1994 Asian Games
Medalists at the 1998 Asian Games
20th-century Japanese women
21st-century Japanese women